CJBC is a Canadian Class A clear-channel station, which broadcasts at 860 AM in Toronto, Ontario. It is the city's affiliate of the Ici Radio-Canada Première network. CJBC's studios are located at the Canadian Broadcasting Centre, while its transmitter is located in Hornby.

History

The station was originally launched in 1925 as CKNC on 840 AM, owned by the Canadian National Carbon Company. In January 1927, the station moved to 690 kHz, returning to 840 kHz a month later. The station then moved to 580 in 1928, and to 1030 kHz in 1931.

The station was leased and then acquired by the Canadian Radio Broadcasting Commission, the forerunner of the modern Canadian Broadcasting Corporation, in 1933 and became CRCY, before leaving the airwaves in 1935. The following year, it returned at 1420 kHz, as a signal booster for CRCT. The station's callsign was changed to CBY in 1938, in 1941 the station moved to 1010 kHz, and the callsign was changed again to the current CJBC on November 15, 1943.

In 1944, CJBC became the flagship of the CBC's Dominion Network. On September 1, 1948, CJBC moved to its current frequency, 860 kHz, exchanging frequencies with the privately-owned CFRB. Its signal strength was boosted to 50,000 watts, up from its previous strength of 1,000 watts. As a Dominion Network affiliate, the station carried network programming in the evening, which included light entertainment fare and some American programming, and local programming during the day.

CJBC began carrying some French language programming in 1962, initially in the form of a nightly, half-hour newscast. With the closure of the Dominion Network on October 1, 1962, CJBC's French schedule expanded to two hours of programming each evening. The station adopted a French-only schedule when it became a fully fledged Radio-Canada station on October 1, 1964. Federal Member of Parliament Ralph Cowan attempted to fight the changeover, arguing that since the French language had no legal status outside of Quebec, the station's conversion to French was inappropriate and illegal; however, his case was dismissed by the Ontario Supreme Court in 1965 on grounds of legal standing, as Cowan could not show material harm from the format change.

The station has been carried on rebroadcasters in Belleville, Kingston and Midland-Penetanguishene since 1977, London since 1978 and Peterborough since 1980. CJBC also had rebroadcasters under the CJBC callsign that served most of northern Ontario that changed to CBON-FM programming out of Sudbury after the station signed on in 1978.

CBEF in Windsor, although officially licensed as a separate station, has also been a de facto rebroadcaster of CJBC since staffing cutbacks in 2009; the station maintained a skeleton staff of just two reporters for local news breaks, while otherwise simulcasting CJBC's programming at all times. Eventually, CBEF would expand its local programming with a morning program and local news bulletins, though otherwise broadcasting a similar schedule as CJBC.

Since 1993, CJBC's Toronto studios have been based at the Canadian Broadcasting Centre on Front Street. A sister station, CJBC-FM, was launched in 1992 to broadcast Radio-Canada's music network.

In 2011, following the revocation of CKLN-FM's licence, the CBC submitted an unsuccessful application to the CRTC to add a nested rebroadcaster of CJBC on 88.1 FM in Toronto with an average effective radiated power of 98 watts and a height above average terrain of 303.4 metres, in order to improve reception in areas of Toronto, due to inefficiencies of the AM signal. On September 11, 2012, the 88.1 FM frequency was awarded to Central Ontario Broadcasting, which would sign on the station as CIND-FM, "Indie88".

The current CJBC is unrelated to another station, owned and operated by the Jarvis Street Baptist Church from 1925 until 1933, which also used the call letters CJBC. That station went dark in 1933 after the government of Canada withdrew all religious broadcasting licenses. The CJBC call letters were subsequently acquired by the Canadian Broadcasting Corporation's CRCY in 1943.

Programming
The station's regional morning program is Y'a pas deux matins pareils, weekdays from 6 a.m. to 9 a.m., and its regional afternoon program L'heure de pointe Toronto, weekdays from 3 p.m. to 6 p.m., is also heard on CBEF in Windsor. On Saturday mornings, the station airs the provincewide morning program À échelle humaine. The provincewide programs air on CBON and CJBC, as well as CBEF. On all public holidays, Pas comme d'habitude is heard provincewide (except Ottawa) from 3 p.m. to 6 p.m. On some holidays, Y'a pas deux matins pareils or Le matin du Nord from CBON airs on both stations, but on some others holidays, both stations air their local shows as usual or both stations air Matins sans frontières from CBEF Windsor.

Transmitters

References

External links
 Ici Radio-Canada Première 
 "ICI Ontario" official website 
 
 

Jbc
Jbc
Jbc
Canadian Radio Broadcasting Commission
Radio stations established in 1925
1925 establishments in Ontario
JBC
Clear-channel radio stations